Markus Schagerl (born 27 March 1981) is an Austrian curler and curling coach.

At the national level, he is a four-time Austrian men's champion curler, two-time Austrian mixed champion curler, and one-time Austrian mixed doubles champion curler.

Teams

Men's

Mixed

Mixed doubles

Record as a coach of national teams

References

External links

 
 
 
 
 Video: 

Living people
1981 births
Austrian male curlers
Austrian curling champions
Austrian curling coaches
Place of birth missing (living people)